St Benedict's Church, Norwich is a Grade I listed Anglican former parish church in Norwich, Norfolk, England. The church is medieval and probably dates from the 11th century. It was badly damaged in an air raid in 1942 and the only part still standing is the round tower.

History
The church  was the most westerly of the five medieval churches along St Benedict's Street, and stood just within the city walls. The patronage of the church belonged to the priory of Buckenham until  the dissolution of the monasteries. It was later purchased from the Crown by the parishioners.

As it stood in the early 19th century, the body of the church consisted of a nave and chancel, with an aisle on the north side only. Philip  Browne, writing in 1814, said that, despite its ancient foundation "the present building has a modern appearance", adding that "the inside is very neat, but has no monumental inscriptions. The communion plate is all of silver, and is modern and elegant. Instead of a communion table, the East end is fitted up with a real altar."

Excavations in 1972 revealed the sequence of the development of the building from the 11th century to the 16th century. The earliest structure found on the site was an 11th-century nave with an apsidal east end. This was later extended eastwards with a square-ended chancel in the Early English style. The date of the tower is obscure; it seems to postdate the original nave, but may still have been built during the Norman period. The whole church was later rebuilt in the Perpendicular style, except for the tower, which was refaced and increased in height at the same time.<ref

name=heritage/> Finally the church was enlarged with the addition of the north aisle. Further restorations and alterations followed up until the end of the 19th century. These included the reconstruction  of the north aisle arcade with cast iron columns in 1896.

The body of the church was largely destroyed in an air raid in January 1942. All that now survives of St Benedict's is the tower, surrounded by a residential development  built in 1976. The appearance of the church before its destruction is recorded in a series of photographs taken by George Plunkett in the 1930s.

The font from St Benedict's is now in the church of St Mary at Erpingham.

Organ
The church contained an organ dating from 1860 by Ward. A specification of the organ can be found on the National Pipe Organ Register.

References

External links
St Benedict's on the European Round Tower Churches website

Benedict
Grade I listed buildings in Norfolk
British churches bombed by the Luftwaffe
Towers in Norfolk
Ruins in Norfolk